Diplotaxis is a large genus of scarab beetles in the subfamily Melolonthinae. There are at least 250 described species in Diplotaxis distributed over North and Central America.

See also
 List of Diplotaxis species

References

Further reading

External links

 

Melolonthinae
Taxa named by William Kirby (entomologist)
Scarabaeidae genera